Aere Mbar  is a town and commune in the Brakna Region of south-western Mauritania. It is located near the border with Senegal.

In 2000 it had a population of 13,722.

References

Communes of Brakna Region